Verona Ádám Bokros (Verona Adam Bokroš, born 1948 in Ada, SAP Vojvodina, SFR Yugoslavia) is a Serbian politician of Hungarian descent. She graduated from the University of Belgrade's Law School in 1971 and has passed her judicial exam in 1985. Justice Adam Bokros worked on commercial, health and misdemeanor law issues. From 1989 to 1991 she was the President of the Assembly of Vojvodina. In May 1991, she was elected Justice of the Constitutional Court of Serbia. She is a member of the Socialist Party of Serbia.

References

Living people
Ethnic Hungarian politicians in Vojvodina
20th-century Serbian judges
Socialist Party of Serbia politicians
Serbian women in politics
University of Belgrade Faculty of Law alumni
People from Ada, Serbia
Constitutional court women judges
20th-century Hungarian women politicians
1948 births